9 is the ninth studio album by American country music singer Jason Aldean. It was released on November 22, 2019 via Broken Bow Records. It debuted at No. 2 on the Billboard 200 chart. It also debuted at No. 1 on the Top Country Albums chart.

Content
As with all of Aldean's previous albums, 9 was released on Broken Bow Records, with Michael Knox serving as producer. The lead single is "We Back", a song that was co-written by Tyler Hubbard of Florida Georgia Line. A press release described the 16 tracks as "interwoven [...] in an era that's hyper-focused on singles". The album was noted to have stayed true to Aldean’s “foundation” with his “signature blend of country and rock”.

Commercial performance

The album debuted at No. 2 on the Billboard 200 based on 83,000 equivalent album units, 68,000 of which are in traditional album sales. It also debuted at No. 1 on the Top Country Albums chart, which made it his seventh No. 1 on the chart.  It sold a further 11,000 copies the second week.  As of March 2020, the album has sold 143,300 copies in the United States, with 269,000 units consumed in total.

Track listing

Personnel
Adapted from AllMusic

Jason Aldean - lead vocals, background vocals
Kurt Allison - electric guitar, programming
Blake Bollinger - programming
Perry Coleman - background vocals
Matt Dragstrem - programming
Tony Harrell - Hammond B-3 organ, keyboards, synthesizer
Evan Hutchings - programming
Mike Johnson - steel guitar, lap steel guitar
Tully Kennedy - bass guitar, programming
Michael Knox - programming
Russ Pahl - steel guitar
Alexander Palmer - programming
Danny Rader - 12-string guitar, acoustic guitar, hi-string guitar
Rich Redmond - drums, percussion
Adam Shoenfeld - electric guitar
Ben Stennis - programming
Neil Thrasher - background vocals
Michael Tyler - background vocals

Charts

Weekly charts

Year-end charts

Certifications

References

2018 albums
Jason Aldean albums
BBR Music Group albums
Albums produced by Michael Knox (record producer)